Estadio Ganzábal is a football stadium in La Felguera, Langreo, and is the home of UP Langreo.

History

The history of the stadium starts in the 1920s, when it was called as Estadio La Barraca, with CP La Felguera playing its home games at the stadium, before merging with Racing de Sama for creating the UP Langreo.

In 1961, year of the merge, the stadium was renamed as Estadio Ganzábal as homage to Francisco Fernández Ganzábal, local engineer and president of the club.

In 2006 the stadium was completely renovated. The under-19 teams of Spain and Turkey re-inaugurated the stadium with a friendly game on 20 September 2006. The first game of the local team in the new Ganzábal was played on 3 September 2006. Langreo defeated San Martín by 2–1.

League attendances
This is a list of league and playoffs games attendances of UP Langreo at Ganzábal.

References

External links
UP Langreo official website
Estadios de España 

Football venues in Asturias
Langreo
UP Langreo
Sports venues completed in 1922